Agnes Marie Dobronski (April 21, 1925 – December 27, 2013) was an American educator and politician.

Born in Detroit, Michigan, Dobronski worked for the Dearborn Public Schools and was the business manager. Doronski later served on the Dearborn Public Schools Board of Education. She went to Detroit College of Business and Dearborn College of Business and later received her bachelor's and master's degrees from Eastern Michigan University and also taught at the university. Dobronski served in the Michigan House of Representatives, as a Democrat from 1987 to 1988 and from 1991 to 1998. Dobronski was married to Jim Cichoski. She died in Dearborn, Michigan.

References 

1925 births
2013 deaths
Politicians from Detroit
Politicians from Dearborn, Michigan
Eastern Michigan University alumni
Eastern Michigan University faculty
Women state legislators in Michigan
School board members in Michigan
Democratic Party members of the Michigan House of Representatives
20th-century American politicians
20th-century American women politicians
American women academics
21st-century American women